Félix Rodríguez may refer to:
 Félix Rodríguez (baseball) (born 1972), Major League Baseball pitcher
 Félix Rodríguez (soldier) (born 1941), former CIA intelligence operative
 Félix Rodríguez (footballer) (born 1984), Nicaraguan football midfielder
 Félix Rodríguez, guitar player in the Swedish band, The Sounds
 Félix Rodríguez de la Fuente (1928–1980), Spanish naturalist and broadcaster